Their Law: The Singles 1990–2005 is a singles collection from the UK band the Prodigy. It was released on 17 October 2005, and entered the UK Albums Chart at No. 1 on 23 October.

Formats and singles
The record is available in five versions:
A single CD version (containing 15 tracks),
A limited 2-disc set (containing 15 tracks on the first disc and 16 on the second) with a deluxe photo booklet containing 52 pages of images throughout The Prodigy's history and a 2-page biography,
A DVD (containing a 10-song live set from Brixton Academy (20 December 1997), 15 promotional videos and also 8 bonus videos including unreleased 'Behind the Scenes' content), and
A rare edition only released in Japan and South Korea which is limited to only 2000 copies and contains all of the above packaged in a cardboard box.
A silver vinyl double LP including a MP3 download code (released in July 2014)

The double A-side "Voodoo People" (Pendulum Remix) / "Out of Space" (Audio Bullys Remix) was released as a single, reaching No. 20 in the UK Singles Chart.

The singles "Fire", "Wind It Up (Rewound)" and "Baby's Got a Temper" were left out of the singles compilation, although the later two had their videos featured on the DVD.

Track listing

CD
Disc one
"Firestarter" – 4:42, from The Fat of the Land, shorter edit was released as single
"Their Law" (05 Edit) – 5:36, new remix of track from Music for the Jilted Generation
"Breathe" – 5:36, from The Fat of the Land, shorter edit was released as single
"Out of Space" – 5:02, from Experience, shorter edit was released as single
"Smack My Bitch Up" – 5:43, from The Fat of the Land
"Poison" (95 EQ Edit) – 4:01, single edit of track from Music for the Jilted Generation
"Girls" – 4:12, from Always Outnumbered, Never Outgunned
"Voodoo People" (05 Edit) – 3:40, new edit of track from Music for the Jilted Generation
"Charly" (Alley Cat Remix) – 5:22, single remix from Experience Expanded
"No Good (Start the Dance)" – 6:19, from Music for the Jilted Generation, shorter edit was released as single
"Spitfire" (05 Version) – 3:26, single edit of longer track from Always Outnumbered, Never Outgunned
"Jericho" – 3:46, from Experience
"Everybody in the Place" (Fairground Remix) – 5:09, single remix from Experience Expanded
"One Love" – 5:25, slightly shorter edit of track from Music for the Jilted Generation; shorter edit was released as single
"Hotride" – 4:32, from Always Outnumbered, Never Outgunned

Disc two
"Razor" – 4:00, reworked track from the cancelled album Device 1 by Keith Flint's side project Flint
"Back 2 Skool" – 5:02
"Voodoo People" (Pendulum Remix) – 5:07
"Under My Wheels" (Remix) – 3:14 
"No Man Army" – 4:10, from "Smack My Bitch Up" single, but about 7% faster
"Molotov Bitch" – 4:54, from "Firestarter" single
"Voodoo Beats" – 3:54 
"Out of Space" (Audio Bullys Remix) – 4:56
"The Way It Is" (Live Remix) – 4:16
"We Are the Ruffest" – 5:18, from "Wind It Up (Rewound)" single
"Your Love" – 6:02, from "Charly" single
"Spitfire" (Live) – 4:11
"Their Law" (Live) – 5:31
"Breathe" (Live) – 6:39
"Serial Thrilla" (Live) – 5:15
"Firestarter" (Live) – 5:21

Vinyl
Disc one
"Firestarter" – 4:42, from The Fat of the Land
"Their Law" (05 Edit) – 5:36, from Music for the Jilted Generation
"Breathe" – 5:36, from The Fat of the Land
"Out of Space" – 5:02, from Experience
"Smack My Bitch Up" – 5:43, from The Fat of the Land
"Poison" (95 EQ Edit) – 4:01, from Music for the Jilted Generation
"Girls" – 4:12, from Always Outnumbered, Never Outgunned
"Voodoo People" (05 Edit) – 3:40, from Music for the Jilted Generation
Disc two
"Charly" (Alley Cat Remix) – 5:22, from Experience
"No Good (Start the Dance)" – 6:19, from Music for the Jilted Generation
"Spitfire" (05 Version) – 3:26, from Always Outnumbered, Never Outgunned
"Jericho" – 3:46, from Experience
"Everybody in the Place" (Fairground Remix) – 5:09, from Experience
"One Love" (Original Mix Edit) – 5:25, from Music for the Jilted Generation
"Hotride" – 4:32, from Always Outnumbered, Never Outgunned

DVD
Live at Brixton Academy 20 December 1997
"Smack My Bitch Up" – 6:24
"Voodoo People" – 2:40
"Voodoo Beats" – 4:04
"Their Law" – 5:15
"Funky Shit" – 4:58
"Breathe" – 5:56
"Serial Thrilla" – 5:38
"Mindfields" – 5:35
"Fuel My Fire" – 3:25
"Firestarter" – 5:30

Music videos
"Firestarter" – 3:47
"Poison" – 4:00
"No Good (Start the Dance)" – 3:57
"Breathe" – 3:58
"Out of Space" – 3:42
"Smack My Bitch Up" – 4:35
"Charly" – 3:38
"Spitfire" – 3:24
"Voodoo People" – 5:08
"Girls" – 3:49
"Everybody in the Place" – 3:50
"Baby's Got a Temper" – 4:25
"Wind It Up (Rewound)" – 3:29
"One Love" – 3:55
"Voodoo People" (Pendulum Remix) – 3:15

Extras
"Spitfire" (Live at Pinkpop 2005) – 3:53
"Their Law" (Live at Red Square 1997) – 5:11
"Break and Enter" (Live at Glastonbury 1995) – 6:04
"Always Outnumbered Never Outgunned" (Demo Mix) – 2:17, Access by pressing right after "Break and Enter" is played

Behind the Scenes
"Firestarter" – 11:01
"Voodoo People" – 2:44
"Out of Space" – 2:47
"Poison" – 6:37

Charts

Weekly charts

Year-end charts

References 

2005 greatest hits albums
XL Recordings albums
The Prodigy albums
2005 video albums
Music video compilation albums
XL Recordings video albums
Live video albums
2005 live albums
XL Recordings live albums
Albums produced by Liam Howlett